Petros Kyprianou (born Limassol, Cyprus) is the current Director of Track & Field and Cross Country at the University of Illinois and the former head coach of the University of Georgia Bulldogs men's and women's track and field teams (jumps, decathlon and heptathlon). Kyprianou was voted the United States Track & Field/CC Coaches Association 2018 Indoor & Outdoor National Coach of the Year following two historic first NCAA team titles for the University of Georgia track and field (women indoor & men outdoor). Additionally, Kyprianou was the 2017 Outdoor National Women's Coach of the year following a very close NCAA runner up finish to Oregon (1.8 points). The Bulldogs have amassed 12 top 4 NCAA finishes the last five seasons.

Kyprianou produced and coached several Olympians, World Championships medalists, National champions, NCAA and American record holders, including:

Kendell Williams
Keturah Orji
Maicel Uibo
Levern Spencer
Karl Robert Saluri
Leontia Kallenou
Devon Williams
Chanice Porter
Madeleine Fagan
Kate Hall
Karel Tilga
Lynna Irby
Garrett Scantling
Johannes Erm
Jasmine Moore

Kyprianou has served as an Olympic coach for four different Olympic national teams in the last three Olympic Games.

References

External links
https://www.iaaf.org/news/report/heptathlon-kendell-williams-ncaa-indoor-champ

Living people
People from Limassol
Georgia Bulldogs and Lady Bulldogs track and field coaches
American track and field coaches
Sportspeople from Georgia (U.S. state)
1978 births